The Catherine Ahern Three-Decker is a historic triple decker in Worcester, Massachusetts.  It is a well-preserved example of a triple-decker that predates the popularity of that building type.  Built in 1888, it has Italianate design details, including a low pitch hipped roof, and a decorated porch sheltering the front door.  It is unusual in that its long side faces the street.  Its first documented owner was Catherine Ahern.

The building was listed on the National Register of Historic Places in 1990.

See also
National Register of Historic Places listings in southwestern Worcester, Massachusetts
National Register of Historic Places listings in Worcester County, Massachusetts

References

Apartment buildings in Worcester, Massachusetts
Apartment buildings on the National Register of Historic Places in Massachusetts
Italianate architecture in Massachusetts
Houses completed in 1888
Triple-decker apartment houses
National Register of Historic Places in Worcester, Massachusetts